Chitose No.3 Dam  is a gravity dam located in Hokkaido Prefecture in Japan. The dam is used for power production. The catchment area of the dam is 243.4 km2. The dam impounds about 54  ha of land when full and can store 3648 thousand cubic meters of water. The construction of the dam was started on 1916 and completed in 1918.

References

Dams in Hokkaido
Dams completed in 1918